HMS Success was a member of the Gibraltar Group of 24-gun sixth rates. After commissioning she spent her career in Home waters, the West Indies and the North America on trade protection duties. She was sold in 1743.

Success was the sixth named vessel since it was used for a 34-gun ship captured from the French (Jules) on 19 October 1650 and sold in 1662 (known as Old Success from 1660).

Construction
She was ordered on 9 October 1711 from Portsmouth Dockyard to be built under the guidance of Richard Stacey, Master Shipwright of Portsmouth. She was launched on 30 April 1712. She was completed for sea on 3 July 1712 at an initial cost of £2,093.16.13/4d to build.

Commissioned Service
She was commissioned in 1712 under the command of Commander John Briscoe, RN (promoted to captain in January 1713) for service in Virginia. With the death of Captain Briscoe in early 1714, Captain Samuel Meads, RN took command in January 1714. She returned to Home Waters to undergo a small repair at Deptford between September and December 1716 costing £1,302.8.91/2d. In 1716 Capt George Clinton, RN followed by Captain Isaac Townsend, RN in February 1720 were in command both serving in Ireland. She was refitted at Portsmouth for £1,866.9.61/2d during January/March 1724. She underwent a great repair at Portsmouth during October 1727 thru July 1728 at a cost of £4,640.3.0d. She was recommissioned in June 1728 with Captain William Smith, RN in command for service in the West Indies. February 1729 saw Captain Richard Symonds, RN in command followed by Captain Thomas Smith, RN in May 1730 for service in the English Channel. She was paid off in April 1732.

She was recommissioned under Captain Ellis Brand, for service in the North Sea followed by Captain John Towry, RN for service in the English Channel in November 1732. She paid off in November 1733. She underwent a small repair at Portsmouth in June 1735 costing £200.16.0d. Under Admiralty Order (AO) June 1739 she was converted to a fireship of 8 guns, six swivels and 55 men at Portsmouth at a cost of £2,552.14.0d during June to September 1739. Upon completion she was recommissioned under Commander James Peers, RN and joined Vernon's squadron in January 1740. Commander Daniel Hore, RN (promoted to captain in April 1741) took command in February and participated in the attack on Charges on 23 March 1741 followed by Cartagena Operations in March through April 1741. By February 1742 she was under the command of Commander Thomas Hanway, RN for service in the Channel Islands.

Disposition
HMS Success was sold at Plymouth for £450 on 22 July 1743.

Notes

Citations

References
 Winfield 2009, British Warships in the Age of Sail (1603 – 1714), by Rif Winfield, published by Seaforth Publishing, England © 2009, EPUB , Chapter 6, The Sixth Rates, Vessels acquired from 2 May 1660, Gibraltar Group, Success
 Winfield 2007, British Warships in the Age of Sail (1714 – 1792), by Rif Winfield, published by Seaforth Publishing, England © 2007, EPUB , Chapter 6, Sixth Rates, Sixth Rates of 20 or 24 guns, Vessels in Service at 1 August 1714, Gibraltar Group, Success
 Colledge, Ships of the Royal Navy, by J.J. Colledge, revised and updated by Lt Cdr Ben Warlow and Steve Bush, published by Seaforth Publishing, Barnsley, Great Britain, © 2020, EPUB , (EPUB), Section S (Success)

 

1710s ships
Corvettes of the Royal Navy
Ships built in Portsmouth
Naval ships of the United Kingdom